Sota Kitahara (born January 11, 2003) is an American soccer player who plays as a midfielder for Major League Soccer club Seattle Sounders FC.

He was raised in Edmonds, Washington, and graduated from Edmonds-Woodway High School after joining the Sounders academy. He played for USL Championship side Tacoma Defiance from 2019 to 2022.

On July 17, 2021, he was loaned to FC Pinzgau Saalfelden. Kitahara signed with the senior team for the Sounders on October 28, 2022.

Personal life
Born in the United States, Kitahara is of Japanese descent.

References

External links
 

Association football midfielders
American expatriate soccer players
American soccer players
American sportspeople of Japanese descent
Expatriate footballers in Austria
Seattle Sounders FC players
Soccer players from Washington (state)
United States men's youth international soccer players
2003 births
Living people
Homegrown Players (MLS)